Neoptychites is an extinct ammonoid cephalopod genus from the Turonian stage of the Upper Cretaceous (around 94 to 89 Ma), with a worldwide distribution.

Description 
Neoptychites includes extremely involute Ammonitida whose outer whorls have a high triangular section with a moderately rounded venter (the outer rim). Tho body chamber in adults is generally smooth, with a constricted aperture. The earliest whorls are smooth except for periodic constrictions; later juvenile whorls have numerous low ribs without tubercles.

Taxonomy 
Neoptychites belongs to the ammonite family Vascoceratidae and is included in the subfamily Vasoceratinae. The genus was named by Kossmat in 1895. Its type species is Ammonites telinga Stoliczka, 1865  (= Ammonites cephalotus Courtiller, 1860). It is probably derived from Paravascoceras.

Distribution 
Fossils of Neoptychites have been found in Austria, Brazil, Cameroon, Colombia (La Frontera (Huila, Cundinamarca, Boyacá) and Loma Gorda Formations, Aipe, Huila), Egypt, France, India, Jordan, Mexico, Morocco, Niger, Nigeria, Romania, Tunisia, United States (Arizona, Colorado, New Mexico, Texas), and Venezuela.

References

Bibliography

Further reading 
 
 
 

Cretaceous ammonites
Ammonites of Africa
Cretaceous Africa
Ammonites of Asia
Cretaceous Asia
Ammonites of Europe
Cretaceous Europe
Cretaceous France
Ammonites of North America
Cretaceous Mexico
Cretaceous United States
Ammonites of South America
Cretaceous Brazil
Cretaceous Colombia
Cretaceous Venezuela
Turonian life
Fossil taxa described in 1895